Han Ahmedowiç Ahmedow (16 June 1936 – 6 December 2006) was a Turkmen politician who served as the first and only prime minister of Turkmenistan from December 1989 to May 1992.

Life and career
He graduated from the Tashkent Institute of Railway Transport Engineers in 1959, after which he worked at the Ashgabat Station of the Ashgabat Railway. In 1962, he became head of the Chardzhou Branch of the Central Asian Railway. Then in 1980, he became Head of the Department of Transport and Communications of the Central Committee of the Communist Party of the Turkmen SSR. In 1985, he succeeded Saparmyrat Nyýazow as the first secretary of the Ashgabat City Committee of the CPT. In 1988, he became First Deputy Chairman of the Council of Ministers of the Turkmen SSR, and in December 1989, Chairman of the Council of Ministers of the Turkmen SSR. The following November, Turkmenistan established more decommunised government institutions, leading to Ahmedow becoming Prime Minister of the Turkmen SSR.

During his time in office, Turkmenistan declared independence from the collapse of the Soviet Union in October 1991. Afterwards, Ahmedow became Railways Minister (1991–1992), Deputy Head of the Government of Turkmenistan (1991–1992), and then ambassador to Turkey (1992–1994)..

Later life and death 
In September 2002 he was arrested and placed under internal exile in Serdar, where he remained until he died of a heart attack in late 2006. According to relatives of Ahmedow, the government did not allow him to receive medical treatment in Ashgabat.

Notes

References 

External Sources
Rulers.org

2006 deaths
1936 births
People from Türkmenbaşy
Recipients of the Order of the Red Banner of Labour
Turkmenistan exiles
Prime Ministers of Turkmenistan
Ambassadors of Turkmenistan to Turkey
Heads of government of the Turkmen Soviet Socialist Republic